Brydolf is a Swedish surname. Notable people with the surname include: 

Märtha Brydolf (1868–1956), Swedish politician and journalist
Nathalie Brydolf (born 1995), Swedish singer
Patrik Brydolf (born 1991), Swedish tennis player

Swedish-language surnames